Jane Wright may refer to:

 Jane Wright (swimmer) (born 1955), Canadian swimmer
 E. Jane Wright, aka Denise Moore, aviator
 Jane C. Wright (1919–2013), oncologist
 Jane Wright (entomologist) (born 1954)